DYIO (101.1 FM) - broadcasting as Y101 - is a radio station owned and operated by GVM Radio/TV Corporation. The station's studio and transmitter are located at the 2nd Floor, Gaisano Country Mall, Brgy. Banilad, Cebu City. This station operates round-the-clock.

History
DYIO began its test transmission in 1979 and made its inaugural broadcast on March 1, 1980, under the ownership of Trans-Radio Broadcasting Corporation of Emilio Tuason, the original owner of Manila-based 99.5 RT. The station's original studio was located at Danaque Building along Osmeña Blvd.

Tuason and his cousin Binggoy Remedios were the station's first voices. Y101 adapted 99.5 RT's format and iconic slogan "The Rhythm of the City".

Since the 1990s, Y101 transferred its ownership to GVM Radio/TV Corporation. Y101 changed to its present slogan, "Always First".

References

External links
Official Website

Y101
DYIO
Contemporary hit radio stations in the Philippines